Bridgeman is an unincorporated community in May Township, Cass County, Minnesota, United States, near Motley and Pillager. It is along 57th Avenue SW (Cass County Road 35) near 116th Street SW.

References

Unincorporated communities in Cass County, Minnesota
Unincorporated communities in Minnesota